A romancero is a collection of Spanish romances, a type of folk ballad (sung narrative). The romancero is the entire corpus of such ballads. As a distinct body of literature they borrow themes such as war, honour, aristocracy and heroism from epic poetry, especially the medieval cantar de gesta and chivalric romance, and they often have a pretense of historicity. 

The romancero was once thought to extend back in time to before the earliest Old Spanish cantares, like the Poema del Cid, but it is now argued that they are instead successors to the truly epic chivalric genres. The earliest examples of romances date from the fourteenth century, and some are shortened narrations of stories drawn from the cantares and romances. Many tales take place against the backdrop of the Reconquista, showing Spaniards and Moors in conflict or in love, while others draw their themes from the Matter of Britain or the Matter of France.

Romancero gitano (Gypsy Romancero) is title of a book of songs by Federico Garcia Lorca, many of which have themes derived from the life and culture of the Gypsies of Andalusia.

References
Romancero. (2011). In Encyclopædia Britannica. Retrieved on 22 February 2011.
Romancero tradicional de las lenguas hispánicas. Ed. by R. Menéndez Pidal, D. Catalán, et al. Madrid: Editorial Gredos, 1957-85). 12 vols.
Katz, Israel J. "Romancero," Diccionario de la Música Española e Hispanoamericana (Madrid: Sociedad General de Autores y Editores, 2002).
Spanish literature

Further reading
 García, Miriam Pimentel. Catálogo-índice de romances y canciones narrativas de tradición oral. 2020. DOI: https://doi.org/10.17561/blo.vanejo5

it:Romance (poesia)
no:Romance
pl:Romanca